The 2022 Campeonato Brasileiro de Futebol Feminino Série A3 (officially the Brasileirão Feminino Binance A-3 2022 for sponsorship reasons) was the first season of the Campeonato Brasileiro de Futebol Feminino Série A3, the third level of women's football in Brazil. The tournament was organized by CBF. It started on 11 June and ended on 28 August 2022.

The competition was contested by 32 teams, either qualified by participating in their respective state championships (27) or by the 2022 men's CBF ranking (5). The four semi-finalists, 3B da Amazônia, Sport, AD Taubaté and Vila Nova/UNIVERSO, were promoted to the 2023 Campeonato Brasileiro de Futebol Feminino Série A2.

AD Taubaté defeated 3B da Amazônia 3–2, on aggregate, in the finals to win their first title.

Format
The competition was a single-elimination tournament with each round contested a home-and-away two-legged basis. The highest-ranked-federation team in the 2022 Women's State Ranking hosted the second leg. If the teams belonged to the same federation the highest-ranked team in the 2022 Women's Club Ranking would host the second leg. The first rounds were organized regionally.

If tied on aggregate, the away goals rule would not be used, extra time would not be played, and the penalty shoot-out would be used to determine the winners (Regulations Article 14).

The four semi-finalists were promoted to the 2023 Campeonato Brasileiro de Futebol Feminino Série A2.

Teams

Federation ranking
The number of teams from each state was chosen based on the CBF Women's State Ranking. Originally four teams would qualify via 2022 Men's Club Ranking (RNC) but as Maranhão championship was cancelled, a fifth team qualified via RNC.

Participating teams

Round of 32
The matches were played from 11 to 26 June 2022.

Matches

|}

Round of 16
The matches were played from 2 to 10 July 2022.

Matches

|}

Quarter-finals
The matches were played from 16 to 24 July 2022.

Matches

|}

Semi-finals
The matches were played from 6 to 14 August 2022.

Matches

|}

Finals
The matches were played on 20 and 28 August 2022.

Matches

|}

Top goalscorers

References

Women's football leagues in Brazil
2022 in Brazilian football